Mae On is a district (amphoe) of Chiang Mai province in the north of Thailand.

Geography
The district is about 40 km east of the city of Chiang Mai. Neighboring districts are (from the west clockwise) San Kamphaeng and Doi Saket of Chiang Mai Province; Mueang Pan and Mueang Lampang of Lampang province, Ban Thi, Mueang Lamphun and Mae Tha of Lamphun province.

Mae Ta Krai National Park protects the source of the On River (น้ำแม่ออน), a tributary of the Ping River that gives its name to the district.

Mae On is a popular destination for rock climbers who wish to climb the limestone cliffs of "Crazy Horse Buttress" in the Khun Tan Range. Rock climbing at Crazy Horse has greatly expanded since 2000 due to the work of Joshua Morris and Khaetthaleeya Uppakham while writing their book, A Guide to Rock Climbing in Northern Thailand. Other tourist attractions of the town include natural hot springs and the Mae On cave system.

History
The minor district (king amphoe) was created on 30 April 1994, when six tambons were split off from San Kamphaeng district.

On 15 May 2007, all 81 minor districts were upgraded to full districts. On 24 August the upgrade became official.

Administration

Central administration 
The district Mae On is subdivided into 6 subdistricts (Tambon), which are further subdivided into 49 administrative villages (Muban).

Local administration 
There are 6 subdistrict administrative organizations (SAO) in the district:
 On Nuea consisting of the complete subdistrict On Nuea.
 On Klang consisting of the complete subdistrict On Klang.
 Ban Sahakon consisting of the complete subdistrict Ban Sahakon.
 Huai Kaeo consisting of the complete subdistrict Huai Kaeo.
 Mae Tha consisting of the complete subdistrict Mae Tha.
 Tha Nuea consisting of the complete subdistrict Tha Nuea.

References

External links 

 amphoe.com

Mae On